The Koerner House is a historic building located in Palm Springs, California. The house was designed in 1955 for the Vancouver-based couple of Leon Koerner and Thea Koerner.

The house is a fine example of the residences that master architect E. Stewart Williams designed between 1947 and the end of the 1960s. The single-story structure features a shed roof, deep overhangs, and large glass surface areas with sliding glass doors that facilitate its indoor-outdoor flow. He also integrated natural wood that was utilized for its post-and-beam construction, board-and-batten cladding, interior cabinets, closets and built-in furniture. The landscaping was designed by Eckbo, Royston and Williams. The house was listed on the National Register of Historic Places in 2016.

References

Houses completed in 1955
Buildings and structures in Palm Springs, California
National Register of Historic Places in Riverside County, California
Houses on the National Register of Historic Places in California
Modernist architecture in California
E. Stewart Williams buildings
1955 establishments in California